Sooty is a British children's slapstick television series that aired on CITV from September 2011 until 2018. It was the fifth such incarnation of the series to feature the titular character Sooty, and the first since the last series ended in 2004, it is also the first since presenter Richard Cadell bought the licensing rights to the brand in 2008. This programme focuses on the storyline of the titular character, two of his puppet friends, and the presenter starting a new life running a holiday park known as Slater’s Holiday Park based at a British coastal resort.

Premise

This series focuses on the storyline of Richard, the presenter starting a brand new job at "Slater's Holiday Park" set in a British coastal resort, along with Sooty (the titular character), Sweep and Soo.

Production

The series is filmed at Brean Leisure Park in Somerset, an amusement park that was co-owned by Cadell until 2014.

Cast

Main 

Richard Cadell – he is the presenter of the show and is Sooty's best friend.
Sooty – he is a mute yellow bear who is the protagonist of the show. He owns a magic wand whose power is invoked using the words "Izzy wizzy, Let's get busy!". 
Sweep – a dim-witted grey dog with a penchant for bones and sausages. He communicates using bizarre squeaks.
Soo – a calm and collected female panda who acts as the foil for both Sooty and Sweep. Usually wears a red skirt. She wears pink wellies as seen in an episode. Voiced by Brenda Longman.

Celebrity guests 

Celebrity guests in the first series were Stacey Solomon, Justin Lee Collins, Keith Chegwin, John Shuttleworth, Paul Daniels, Debbie McGee, Brendan Cole, Matthew Corbett, Frank Bruno, Jimmy Carlo, Norman Barrett and Ann Widdecombe.
Celebrity guests in the second series include Joe Pasquale, Amy Childs, Caroline Quentin, Dave Benson Phillips, Brian Blessed, B*Witched, Richard Arnold, The Krankies, Helen Pearson and Stu Francis.
 Celebrity guests in the third series included Faye Tozer, John Challis, Peter Andre and Lisa Riley

Episodes

Series overview

Pilot (2009)
The series pilot, "The Big Day Out", was released in 2009. It concerns Richard taking Sooty, Sweep, and Soo to the seaside, but in true Sooty Show style – nothing goes to plan.

Series 1 (2011)

Series 2 (2013)

Series 3 (2018)
On 15 April 2018, the official Sooty Twitter account announced that a third series had been greenlit. The series was filmed in June 2018 over a two-week period and began airing in September of the same year. This series airs on ITVBe's LittleBe programming strand instead of on CITV.

Special (2022)
On February 21, 2022, a special episode was produced to promote the upcoming "Sooty Land" theme park area at Crealy Theme Park, which opens in May 2022.

Home media

Planned movie 
A movie based on the series is due to be released in the future. The logline is, "Soo has been kidnapped by an evil showbiz impresario who will pull every trick in the book to turn her into a global superstar and Sooty and Sweep need her back." Brenda Longman announced in a Q&A with fans, that it is in pre–production, but she is not sure of a release date.

References

External links
 The Official Sooty Website
 Sooty at itv.com/citv
 

2010s British children's television series
2010s British workplace comedy television series
2011 British television series debuts
2018 British television series endings
British children's comedy television series
British television shows featuring puppetry
ITV children's television shows
Television episodes set in amusement parks
Sooty